Washington Township is one of sixteen townships in Elkhart County, Indiana, USA. At the 2000 census, its population was 6,945.

History
It is named after George Washington.

Geography

Cities and towns
 Bristol

Unincorporated towns
 Nibbyville
(This list is based on USGS data and may include former settlements.)

Major highways

Cemeteries
The township contains four cemeteries: Cathcart, Oak Ridge, Proctor and Trout Creek.

References
 United States Census Bureau cartographic boundary files
 U.S. Board on Geographic Names

External links
 Indiana Township Association
 United Township Association of Indiana

Townships in Elkhart County, Indiana
Townships in Indiana